Bjørn Grinde (homepage grinde.one) is a Norwegian biologist working as a scientist in the fields of genetics and evolution, with particular interests in human evolution, happiness and consciousness.

Early life and education 
He was born and grew up in Oslo, Norway, but spent a year as a high-school exchange student at Michigan, USA, in 1969.

He studied natural sciences as well as psychology, anthropology, and pedagogics at the University of Oslo, resulting in a Dr.scient (1981) and a Dr.philos (1984) in biology from the same university.

Work roles 
Grinde has worked as a scientist and professor at leading universities in Norway, USA and Japan.

As of 2021, he works as a senior scientist at the Division of Mental and Physical Health, Norwegian Institute of Public Health.

Areas of interest and research

Molecular evolution
Some of his earlier projects focused on molecular evolution, using viruses as a model system.

Consciousness and happiness
For the later part of his career, the focus has been on understanding how evolution has shaped the human brain with particular reference to what consciousness is and why it serves us positive and negative experiences. The work is related to human behavioral biology (also referred to as evolutionary psychology). The idea us to find ways to improve mental health and quality of life. The approach is based on the idea that natural selection has shaped the human brain. Consequently, our evolutionary history has an impact on present behavior. Our emotional and rational brain functions evolved to serve hunting and gathering behavior in tribal (Stone Age) groups rather than to be optimal for modern human life.

Grinde suggests that happiness is best understood as a question of the net level of positive and negative feelings. Feelings are primarily initiated by the unconscious brain, but can be modified by conscious effort, thus it is possible to improve on happiness by exercising the brain and by seeking an appropriate environment. One strategy as to brain exercise is to use meditative techniques and include words or sentences (by 'self-talk') that activate either the capacity to turn off negative feelings or to turn on positive feelings.

He has published several books on this approach to understand human behavior, including Darwinian Happiness (2002) and The Biology of Happiness (2012).

Personal 
Grinde lives in the forest surrounding Oslo. He is active in the sport orienteering and won the World Masters Championship in 2022.

References

Profile at the Norwegian Research Publication Database (CRISTIN)
Profile at the Norwegian Broadcasting System NRK

Selected books
Grinde B (2002/2012). Darwinian Happiness. Evolution as a Guide for Living and Understanding Human Behavior Darwin Press (translated to Italian in 2015)
Grinde B (2011). "God - A Scientific Update" Darwin Press
Grinde B (2012). "The Biology of Happiness" Springer
Grinde B (2015). "Improving the Human Zoo" Darwin Press
Grinde B (2016). The Evolution of Consciousness. Implications for Mental Health and Quality of Life" Springer

1952 births
Living people
Norwegian biologists
University of Oslo alumni
Academic staff of the University of Oslo